Associated Carrier Group (ACG) is an industry association of US CDMA cellular network operators.

Mission
ACG's stated mission is "to benefit both its members and the consumer by facilitating efficient production and marketing of devices as well as increased competition. The consortium enables its members to work with manufacturers, suppliers and other vendors to develop and procure, for its customers, scarce or unobtainable products in a timely fashion through economies of scale and standardization of coding and other features."

Members
Alaska Communications Systems (ACS)
Alaska Digitel (GCI)
Alltel (acquired by Verizon Wireless, some assets sold to AT&T and Atlantic Tele-Network)
Appalachian Wireless
Bluegrass Cellular acquired by Verizon Wireless
Carolina West Wireless
Cellcom
Cellular One of Northeast Pennsylvania
Cellular South became cSpire
Copper Valley Wireless
Cox Communications
ETEX
Golden State Cellular acquired by Verizon Wireless
Illinois Valley Cellular
Inland Cellular
James Valley Wireless
LEACO
Mid-Rivers Wireless
Mobi
Matanuska Telephone Association
Nex-Tech Wireless
Northwest Missouri Wireless
Open Mobile
nTelos
Pioneer Cellular
PTCI Wireless
Revol Wireless
Sagebrush
Silver Star Communications
South Central Communications
SRT Communications
Strata Networks
Syringa Wireless
Thumb Cellular
United Wireless

See also
List of United States wireless communications service providers

External links
www.associatedcarriergroup.com - Official site

Telecommunications organizations
Business organizations based in the United States